Moyola may refer to:
 River Moyola, Northern Ireland
 Moyola Park, estate on the river
 Baron Moyola, title of James Chichester-Clark
Maigh Seóla, a plain in County Galway, Ireland